Suryamukhi is a 1963 Oriya film directed by Prafulla Sengupta.

Plot
Raju lives with his brother Mohan and mother in a remote village. Gita and Raju love each other. As Raju is a brilliant student, he goes to Cuttack for higher education. There, he meets Usha, his classmate. Usha is inspired by the honesty, simplicity and intellect of Raju and falls in love with him. But Usha's father Rai Bahadur, a wealthy person in the town, doesn't accept his daughter's love interest with a poor village boy. Rai Bahadur insults Raju and threatens him to leave Usha's life. In desperation, Raju leaves Cuttack and ventures into an unknown journey. In the meanwhile, Raju's widowed mother sends Loknath and Mohan to search the whereabouts of Raju. Loknath meets Rai Bahadur, who happens to be his old friend, but can't trace out Raju. Lokanath pursues Rai Bahadur a proposal of Mohan's marriage with Usha. Rai Bahadur agrees. Mohan and Usha's marriage takes place.

Raju eventually finds a job in a factory and one day loses his eyes in an accident. By knowing this, his mother gets terrible blow and passes away. Raju is admitted into a hospital and becomes fully cured. Raju returns home and surprisingly finds his girlfriend Usha is now his sister-in-law. Later, Usha convinces Raju to face the reality and asks him to marry Gita. At last, Raju agrees to marry Gita, with a happy ending.

Cast
 Saumendra Misra as Raju
 Minati Mishra as Usha
 Sukhalata Mohanty as Gita
 Dhira Biswal as Lokanath
 Ananta Mahapatra as Debasis
 Laxmipriya Mahapatra as Odishi dancer
 Sahu Samuel as Mohan
 Bimal Choudhury as Rai Bahadur
 Lakshmi as Raju's mother

Soundtrack
The music for the film is composed by Shantunu Mahapatra.

Box office
The film was appreciated by the masses and was a success.

Awards
  10th National Film Awards 1962
 National Film Award for Best Feature Film in Oriya

References

External links
 

1963 films
Indian drama films
1963 drama films
Films set in Odisha
1960s Odia-language films